George Edward Horton (born October 5, 1953) is an American baseball coach. He was head coach of the Oregon Ducks baseball and Cal State Fullerton Titans baseball programs.

Playing career
Horton was born and raised in Downey, California and graduated from Downey High School in 1971. He played on the Cerritos College baseball team in 1972 and 1973 under coach Wally Kincaid.  Horton then played two seasons under head coach Augie Garrido at Cal State Fullerton in 1975 and 1976.  He was on the Fullerton team that made the school's first appearance in the College World Series in 1975.

Coaching career
Horton began his coaching career the same place he began his collegiate playing career, Cerritos College.  He coached there for two seasons before moving onto Los Angeles Valley College.  From there he went back to Cerritos College as an assistant before eventually becoming the head coach.  He was later hired by his former coach, Augie Garrido, to be an assistant at Cal State Fullerton.  When Garrido left in 1996, Horton was hired to replace him.

In 2003, Horton was named 2003 National Coach of the Year by Baseball America.

In 2004, Horton would face off against his old boss in the 2004 College World Series championship series.  The Fullerton Titans won the series and the national championship.

In September 2007, Horton was named the head coach of the University of Oregon, which reinstated its baseball program starting in the 2009 season after being a club sport since 1982. In his first season at the helm of the Ducks the team was 14–42.

In 2010, Horton led the Ducks to the NCAA Division I baseball Tournament for the first time since 1964. The 2010 Ducks baseball team finished the season with a 40–24 overall record. On May 28, 2019, Horton and Oregon mutually agreed to part ways.

Head coaching record

References

External links
 Cal State Fullerton profile

1953 births
Living people
Cal State Fullerton Titans baseball coaches
Cal State Fullerton Titans baseball players
Cerritos Falcons baseball coaches
Cerritos Falcons baseball players
Oregon Ducks baseball coaches
People from Downey, California